was the pseudonym of a nihonga painter in Meiji through to the early Shōwa period Japan. His real name was Shimomura Seizaburō.

Biography 
Kanzan was born in 1873 in Wakayama city, Wakayama Prefecture into a family of hereditary Noh actors.

Having moved to Tokyo at the age of eight, Kanzan studied under Kanō Hōgai, and after Hōgai's death, under Hashimoto Gahō. He graduated first in his class at the Tōkyō Bijutsu Gakkō (the forerunner of the Tokyo National University of Fine Arts and Music), and became a teacher at the same institution in 1894.

When Okakura Tenshin left government service to establish the Japan Fine Arts Academy (Nihon Bijutsuin), Kanzan joined him, together with Yokoyama Taikan and Hishida Shunsō. However, Kanzan returned to his teaching post at the Tokyo Bijutsu Gakkō from 1901–1908, with a hiatus from 1903–1905, when he went to study in England.

From 1914, he helped reestablish the Japan Fine Arts Academy, and in 1917 was appointed a court painter to the Imperial Household Agency. He served as a judge for both the Bunten and the Inten Exhibitions.

In terms of style, Kanzan was influenced by the Rinpa and the Kanō schools, as well as early Buddhist paintings and Tosa school Emakimono. To these elements, he combined the realism developed from his exposure to western art works during his stay in England.

One of his representative works is a byōbu titled Yoroboshi or "The Beggar Monk" was created in 1915 in colored ink and gold leaf on paper. It is currently housed in the Tokyo National Museum, and is registered as an Important Cultural Property by the Agency for Cultural Affairs. The screen depicts a scene from a famous Noh play of the same name. In the scene, blind monk, has been falsely accused of a crime. Disowned by his family he wanders about, living as a vagrant. Although he is now blind, he has become one with the universe and can see all that surrounds him. Kanzan borrowed heavily from Momoyama period and Edo period style and composition, and the work shows a strong Rimpa influence.

Notable works
光明皇后 (1897, Imperial Household Agency)
修羅道 (1900, Tokyo National Museum)
鵜鴎図 (1901, Museum of Modern Art, Shiga)
ダイオゼニス ("Diogenes", 1903, Tokyo National Museum of Modern Art)
木の間の秋 (1907, Tokyo National Museum of Modern Art, Important Cultural Property)

大原御幸 (1908, Tokyo National Museum of Modern Art)
鵜図屏風 (1912, Tokyo National Museum)
白狐 (1914, Tokyo National Museum)
弱法師 (1915, Tokyo National Museum, Important Cultural Property)
春雨 (1916, Tokyo National Museum)
楠公 (1921, Tokyo National Museum)
景雲餘彩 (1922, Imperial Household Agency)

External links

 
 SHIMOMURA KANZAN, PAINTING OF A MOTH
 Shimomura, Kanzan / WorldCat

1873 births
1930 deaths
Court painters
Nihonga painters
Buddhist artists
People from Wakayama (city)
Tokyo School of Fine Arts alumni
20th-century Japanese painters
Imperial household artists
Artists from Wakayama Prefecture